Jahangir Nagar is the former name of Dhaka, Bangladesh. It was named after Mughal Emperor Jahangir.

Name
In 1608, Dhaka was announced by Subedar Islam Khan as the capital of Mughal Bangla. He christened it as Jahangir Nagar (City of Jahangir). The There was a fort beside the river Buriganga named Kella-e-Jahangir (Fort of Jahangir).

University
To show respect to this name, a fully residential public university was established in Dhaka in 1970 as Jahangirnagar University.

See also
Old Dhaka
 History of Dhaka

References

History of Dhaka